Nikola Višňová (born 25 May 1992 in Brno) is a Czech ice dancer who competed for Slovakia with Lukáš Csölley from 2006 to 2011. They are three-time (2009–2011) Slovak national champions and reached the free dance at five World Junior Championships. Their best result, 5th, came at the 2011 World Junior Championships.

Career 
In 2006, Višňová teamed up with Slovak skater Lukáš Csölley. They decided to represent Slovakia. In their first two seasons, they trained under Gabriela Hrázská in Brno, Bratislava, and Oberstdorf. They finished 19th at the 2007 World Junior Championships in Oberstdorf and 17th at the 2008 World Junior Championships in Sofia.

In the 2008–09 season, Višňová/Csölley trained in Berlin, Oberstdorf, and Brno, coached by Hendryk Schamberger. They placed 17th at the 2009 World Junior Championships in Sofia.

During the next two seasons, the two were coached by Roberto Pelizzola and Raffaella Cazzaniga in Milan. They ranked 20th at the 2010 European Championships in Tallinn, Estonia; 19th at the 2010 World Junior Championships in The Hague, Netherlands; 22nd at the 2011 European Championships in Bern, Switzerland; and 5th at the 2011 World Junior Championships in Gangneung, South Korea. In September 2011, it was reported that their partnership had ended.

Programs 
(with Csolley)

Competitive highlights 
JGP: Junior Grand Prix

References

External links 

 
 Official website of Visnova / Csolley

1992 births
Figure skaters from Brno
Czech female ice dancers
Slovak female ice dancers
Living people